Saint Varnava the New Confessor (31 January 1914 – 12 November 1964) was the titular bishop of Hvosno and a saint of the Serbian Orthodox Church. His feast is October 30 on Julian Calendar. He is one of the American Saints along with Alexis Toth, Alexander Hotovitzky, Herman of Alaska, Peter the Aleut, and others.

He is also referred to as Saint Varnava of Hvosno (Свети Варнава Хвостански).

Life
He was born Vojislav Nastić in Gary, Indiana, on January 31, 1914 into a family of Serbian immigrants. His parents were Atanasije and Zorka Nastić and the family attended the St. Sava Serbian Orthodox Church of Gary, Indiana which is now located in Merrillville. Nastić was baptized there, later served as an altar boy, and was first recognized as a youthful prodigy in reciting Serbian traditional epic poetry.

While Nastić was still a child, the family returned to their homeland. He attended high school in Sarajevo, and graduating in 1933. He continued his education at the University of Belgrade's Faculty of Orthodox Theology, graduating in 1937. After graduating, he taught as a catechist in two high schools in Sarajevo.

In 1940, Nastić took monastic vows in Mileševa Monastery, receiving the monastic name Varnava (Barnabas). Varnava was ordained hierodeacon by Metropolitan Bishop Petar of Dabar-Bosna. Varnava remained in Sarajevo during the World War II. Croatian fascists, however, tried to force him to join the Croatian Orthodox Church, which they had organized to subvert the Serbian population in Croatia and Bosnia-Herzegovina. Varnava categorically refused this. Soon he had to leave Sarajevo in order to save his life.

After the war, he was ordained hieromonk and raised to the rank of protosyncellus by Bishop Nektarije of Zvornik and Tuzla. In its first regular session, the Holy Assembly of the Serbian Orthodox Church elected Varnava the auxiliary bishop to the Serbian Patriarch with the title Bishop of Hvosno, with the responsibility of administering the Diocese of Dabar-Bosnia. On 28 August 1947, he received the episcopal consecration by Patriarch Gavrilo, bishop Nektarije, and bishop Vikentije of Zletovo and Strumica.

In his new position, bishop Varnava began openly criticizing the new communist regime for mistreating the church. He was soon arrested and sentenced to twenty years in prison. To support the accusation that he was an American spy, it was presented as evidence that he was teaching his sister English so she could be used as a spy for the Americans. Bishop  Varnava was subjected to torture, deprived of food, and was kept in the most isolated wing of the prison. But, he remained calm. Every day he sang the troparia and other hymns. The communist regime even arranged an accident in order to get rid of him in which he broke his leg. Although the communist secret police, OZNA, did not allow doctors to provide him any medical help, he recovered. He was released after this accident to house arrest in the Gomionica Monastery in the Diocese of Banja Luka until his release in 1960.

He died on 12 November 1964, under suspicious circumstances, leading some historians to believe that he was poisoned by OZNA. In 2005, during the regular session of the Holy Assembly of the Serbian Orthodox Church, Bishop Varnava was canonized and his name was added to the list of other saints of the Serbian people and of Orthodox Christian faith.

References

External links
 , the newsletter of the Clergy Brotherhood of the Serbian Orthodox Church in the USA and Canada, with a biography of St. Varnava
Communique from the annual Assembly of Bishops of the Serbian Orthodox Church for 2005

1914 births
1964 deaths
People from Gary, Indiana
20th-century Eastern Orthodox bishops
Bishops of the Serbian Orthodox Church
20th-century Christian saints
University of Belgrade Faculty of Orthodox Theology alumni
Serbian saints of the Eastern Orthodox Church
Burials at Serbian Orthodox monasteries and churches